Qurban Hussain, Baron Hussain (born 27 March 1956 in Kotli, Azad Kashmir) is a British–Pakistani Liberal Democrat politician and life peer.

Hussain was the unsuccessful candidate for parliament for Luton South in 2005 and 2010. He was firstly a member of the Labour Party, from 1996 to 2003, but then joined the Liberal Democrats in protest over the Labour government-backed invasion of Iraq. He was a member of Luton Borough Council from 2003 until 2011, serving as its deputy leader from 2005 to 2007.

Hussain was created a life peer as Baron Hussain, of Luton in the county of Bedfordshire on 20 January 2011. In the Cameron–Clegg coalition government, he served as diversity adviser to Deputy Prime Minister Nick Clegg. Hussain briefly withdrew from the Lib Dem whip in March 2015 for having smuggled an impoverished two-year-old Kashmiri boy into the UK decades earlier, at the request of the boy's mother. He admitted to having committed an offence but insisted it was morally the right thing to do. He was later readmitted to the party whip.

Hussain is a Muslim.

References

External links
 Parliament.uk biography
Liberal Democrats biography

1956 births
Living people
Liberal Democrats (UK) life peers
Pakistani emigrants to the United Kingdom
People from Kotli District
Luton
British politicians of Pakistani descent
Liberal Democrats (UK) parliamentary candidates
British people of Azad Kashmiri descent
Life peers created by Elizabeth II